"Merry Christmas" is a spoken or written greeting traditionally used on or before the Christmas holiday.

Merry Christmas may also refer to:

Film and television
 Merry Christmas (1984 film), a 1984 Hong Kong film directed by Clifton Ko
 Merry Christmas (2000 film), a 2000 Argentine film directed by Lucho Bender
 Merry Christmas (2001 film), a 2001 Italian film directed by Neri Parenti
 Joyeux Noël (Merry Christmas), a 2005 French film
 "Merry Christmas" (Ben 10 episode), an episode of the animated series Ben 10

Music

Albums
 Merry Christmas (Bing Crosby album), 1945
 Merry Christmas (Johnny Mathis album), 1958
 Merry Christmas (The Supremes album), 1965
 Merry Christmas (Andy Williams album), 1965
 Merry Christmas (Daniel Johnston album), 1988
 Merry Christmas (Glen Campbell album), 1991
 Merry Christmas (Mariah Carey album), 1994
 Merry Christmas (FM Einheit and Caspar Brötzmann album), 1994
 Merry Christmas (Jeanette album), 2004
 Merry Christmas (Kate Ceberano album), 2009
 Merry Christmas (Shelby Lynne album), 2010
 Merry Christmas (Leningrad Cowboys album), 2013
 Merry Christmas (Paulini album), 2015
 A Merry Christmas!, Stan Kenton, 1961

Songs
 "Merry Christmas" (song), a song by Ed Sheeran and Elton John
 "Merry Christmas", a song by Melanie from Born to Be
 "Merry Christmas", a song by Stephanie Mills from Christmas
 "Merry Christmas", a song from the 1949 film In the Good Old Summertime

See also
 Merry Christmas Creek, a creek in Alaska
 Mary Christmas, the speculated maiden name for Mrs. Claus
 Christmas (disambiguation)
 Happy Christmas (disambiguation)
 Feliz Navidad (disambiguation)